Watrous  is a small town in the Canadian province of Saskatchewan. Watrous was named after Frank Watrous Morse. The town has several restaurants, a hospital, medical clinic, elementary school, high school, community college, bowling alley, RCMP detachment, banks, a grocery store, and motels.

Watrous is notable for being the location of the transmitter of CBK, CBC Radio One's primary station in Saskatchewan. The transmitter was originally located at Watrous in 1939 in order to cover most of the Prairie Provinces with a strong nighttime signal (the station, then as now, is a 50,000-watt clear-channel station).  It was also intended to serve most of the province's populated area, including Regina and Saskatoon, from one transmitter. While Watrous is the station's city of licence, its actual studios are located in Regina. The Watrous transmitter is still considered the station's primary signal, even though both of the larger urban areas are now served by separate FM rebroadcasters.

History
The All Saints Anglican church on Main Street has a stained glass window that could be over 500 years old. The window may have come from St John the Baptist Anglican Church, Latton, Wiltshire, England.

Demographics 

Transportation
The town is serviced by the Watrous Airport and Via Rail's The Canadian serves the former Watrous railway station site as a flag stop three times per week (in each direction).

Sports and recreation
The Jubilee Drive-In Theatre in Manitou Beach is open from the Victoria Day weekend until October. It is one of the few drive-ins still operating in Saskatchewan. The others include the Prairie Dog Drive-in in Carlyle, the Clearwater Drive-In in Kyle, the Moonlight Movies Drive-in in Pilot Butte, and the Twilite Drive-In Theater in Wolseley.

The Watrous Winterhawks of the Long Lake Hockey League play at the Watrous Centennial Arena. Watrous also has a curling rink, bowling, golfing, swimming, ball diamonds, and a soccer pitch.

Climate 
Watrous has a humid continental climate (Dfb on climate maps). It has very cold winters that give way to warm summers. The average daily mean temperature is 2.3°C while the record low is -43°C and the record high is 39.5°C.

See also
List of towns in Saskatchewan
List of communities in Saskatchewan

References

External links

Towns in Saskatchewan
Division No. 11, Saskatchewan